Therese Manton is a camogie player, a member of the Galway senior panel that unsuccessfully contested the All Ireland finals of 2010 and 2011 against Wexford.

Other awards
All Ireland Club Championship 2011, Senior Gael Linn Cup 2008. two Ashbourne Cup with UCD 2007 2008, two Connacht Vocational School medals with Loughrea, Gael Linn Cup 2008, Pan Celtic with Mullagh 2007, Player of the year for St Brigid’s Vocational School 2006, Junior Connacht medals.

References

External links
 Camogie.ie Official Camogie Association Website

1987 births
Living people
Galway camogie players
UCD camogie players